Vu de l'extérieur is a studio album by French musician Serge Gainsbourg, released in 1973.

Overview
1971's Histoire de Melody Nelson, a first-person concept album depicting the meeting and eventual seduction of doomed English teenager Melody Nelson, was Gainsbourg's first major success in the LP market and helped form his reputation as a controversial figure. Not one to shy away from controversy, Gainsbourg had formed the nucleus of what would become Vu de l'extérieur when he suffered a heart attack at the age of 45. By the time he was back to health, he resumed composing the songs for the new album, among them one of his biggest hits, "Je suis venu te dire que je m'en vais".

While not quite a concept album, especially when compared to other Gainsbourg albums such as Histoire de Melody Nelson, Rock Around the Bunker and L'Homme à tête de chou, certain thematic elements–such as scatology and childishness–do run through the album.

The album sold approximately 20,000 copies upon release in France.

Track listing

Personnel
Credits adapted from liner notes.

 Serge Gainsbourg – arrangement
 Alan Parker – acoustic guitar
 Judd Proctor – acoustic guitar
 Brian Odgers – bass guitar
 David Richmond – bass guitar
 Dougie Wright – drums
 Alan Parker – lead guitar
 Alan Hawkshaw – keyboards, electric piano, organ
 Chris Karan – percussion

References

External links
 
 
 

1973 albums
Serge Gainsbourg albums
Philips Records albums
Concept albums